AIZ may stand for:

Anti-Imperialist Cell (Antiimperialistische Zelle ), a leftist militant group which carried out bombings in Germany in 1995
Arbeiter-Illustrierte-Zeitung, a German illustrated magazine of the 1920s–30s
Lee C. Fine Memorial Airport, an airport in Missouri (airport code AIZ)
Assurant, a specialized insurance company based in New York, NY
The IATA code for Lee C. Fine Memorial Airport, Missouri, United States